Mahmadtoir Zokirzoda is a politician from Tajikistan who is serving as Deputy Prime Minister of Tajikistan and President of Assembly of Representatives of Tajikistan.

Personal life 
He was born in 5 July 1956 in Rasht District.

References 

Tajikistani politicians
1956 births
Living people